This is a list of some of the wilderness study areas (WSA) in the United States as of December 2009. Wilderness study areas are designated lands that meet criteria of the Wilderness Act and are managed as wilderness by their parent agency, pending final determination by Congress.

Bureau of Land Management wilderness study areas 

These areas are administered as part of the National Landscape Conservation System managed by the Bureau of Land Management.

States with BLM wilderness study areas

There are some wilderness study areas that cross state boundaries

BLM wilderness study areas

References

Bureau of Land Management
Wilderness Study Areas
Wilderness Study Areas